The Czech Christian Social Party in the Kingdom of Bohemia, before 1910 known as Party of Catholic People, was a Czech Christian-social political party in Bohemia during times of Austria-Hungary. The party was founded in 1910 as merger of three political parties: the Catholic National Party in the Kingdom of Bohemia, the Christian Social Party in Bohemia, and the Christian Social People's Party in Bohemia under the name Party of Catholic People. The party was inspired by the Centre Party in Germany and Christian Social Party in Austria.

The party cooperated with its older counterpart, the Moravian-Silesian Christian Social Party in Moravia.

References

Catholic political parties
Defunct Christian political parties
KDU-ČSL
Political parties disestablished in 1919
Political parties established in 1906
Political parties in Austria-Hungary
1906 establishments in Austria-Hungary